Erroll Canute Fraser (July 30, 1950 – December 24, 2002) was an ice speed skater from the British Virgin Islands, who represented his native country at the 1984 Winter Olympics in Sarajevo, Yugoslavia at the age of 33. There he finished in 40th (500 m) and 42nd place (1.000 m), in the nation's first-ever appearance at the Winter Olympics.

Fraser is believed to be the only black speed skater in the twentieth century to compete at the Winter Games. The first black speed skater to win an Olympic medal was Shani Davis in 2006.

References

External links
 SkateResults

1950 births
2002 deaths
British Virgin Islands male speed skaters
Olympic speed skaters of the British Virgin Islands
Speed skaters at the 1984 Winter Olympics